Bakaninbreen is a glacier in Heer Land at Spitsbergen, Svalbard. It has a length of about 9.5 kilometers, and merges with the glacier of Paulabreen. The glacier is named after a member of the Swedish-Russian Arc-of-Meridian Expedition. The mountain of Hollertoppen is located between Bakaninbreen and Ragna-Mariebreen.

References

Glaciers of Spitsbergen